Vision and Voice is the first live performance recording by Polish death metal band Vader. It was released in VHS format on 1 December 1998 by Metal Mind. The album consists Vader concert filmed and recorded on 25 March 1998 at Studio Łęg in Kraków, Poland.

The DVD edition entitled More Vision and the Voice was released on 3 June 2002 by Metal Mind. Apart from main concert recorded in Kraków the re-release includes tree video-clips, eight bootleg live tracks from No Mercy Festival 2001, interview with Piotr "Peter" Wiwczarek, band and individual members biographies, discography, photo gallery, desktop images, art gallery, and weblinks. The release was remastered, and converted to Dolby Digital 5.1 Surround at Studio 333 in Częstochowa, Poland by Bartłomiej Kuźniak.

Track listing

Personnel 
Production and performance credits are adapted from the album liner notes.

Release history

References 

Concert films
Vader (band) albums
1998 live albums
1998 video albums
2002 live albums
2002 video albums
Live video albums
Metal Mind Productions video albums
Polish-language live albums